804 may refer to:
804, the year
Area code 804, a telephone area code in the U.S. state of Virginia, whose service region includes the state's capital city of Richmond
"The 804", a common local nickname for the Greater Richmond Region (from the area code)